Fakku (styled as FAKKU!, or simply F!, from the Japanese loanword for fuck: ファック) is the largest English-language hentai publisher in the world.

Fakku was originally an aggregator that provided users with scanlations of adult manga and dōjinshi from Japan. At the start, the content was uploaded exclusively by the site's administrators, but later these privileges were shared with the community, allowing for translators to have their work seen by a much larger audience. However, at the end of 2015, Fakku made the transition into only publishing officially-licensed hentai manga.

Fakku and its creator Jacob Grady have a known relationship with Danny Choo, TV personality and blogger. At Anime Expo 2010, 2011, and 2012 (in Los Angeles, CA) Jacob and Danny hosted community meetups that attracted large audiences of fans and users.

History

Fakku was created in December 2006 by Jacob Grady while he was studying Computer Science in Massachusetts. Fakku was developed under the codename "AAH" or  "All About Hentai" (which later became the site's subtitle). Jacob originally used money from student loans to pay for server and bandwidth costs, but that quickly became unsustainable and shortly after its launch Fakku was forced to shut down. It was brought back up after user donations rescued the site in July 2007.

As of July 2011 Fakku entered into a streaming licensing deal with Kitty Media, a subsidiary of Media Blasters. The deal allows Fakku to stream select anime titles at its discretion, starting with Immoral Sisters. Both the subtitled and dubbed editions of Immoral Sisters were made available to users of Fakku at no charge.

On June 19, 2014, Fakku announced that it had entered into a partnership with Wanimagazine to publish its entire catalog of hentai manga in English. This was the start of their transition into a publisher of only legally-licensed content; by the end of 2015, Fakku had removed all unlicensed scanlations from the site.

On December 11, 2015, Fakku announced plans to run a Kickstarter campaign to publish a remastered version of Toshio Maeda's Urotsukidōji: Legend of the Overfiend manga in English.  The Kickstarter was to be the first step of a plan to publish all of Maeda's work in English, with La Blue Girl, Demon Beast Invasion, and Adventure Kid to come next.  The Kickstarter launched on June 19, 2016, and concluded on July 19, 2016, having met its goal.

On July 7, 2016, Fakku announced the acquisition of Shintaro Kago's ero guro manga Koi no Choujikuuhou and Arisa Yamamoto's non-hentai manga Aiko no Ma-chan.

On July 3, 2017, Fakku announced the addition of three magazines to the service: Girls forM, Comic Bavel, and Comic Europa.

On November 27, 2017, Fakku announced the acquisition of Kitty Media.

In December 2018, hentai streaming and fansubbing website Hentai Haven closed down but announced that they had partnered with Fakku to re-establish the site. On May 11, 2019, Hentai Haven's website started a countdown to when it would start back up, and re-activated starting on May 12, 2019.

On July 6, 2019, Fakku announced the addition of four magazines to the service: Dascomi (relaunch of Comic Europa), Comic Aoha (relaunch of Comic Koh), Comic Happining, and Weekly Kairakuten.

On July 7, 2019, PapaHH—the founder of Hentai Haven—posted a message on the home page of the website, claiming that "Fakku has completely taken over and booted [him] out." It was announced a day later that Grady and PapaHH had settled the issue in private, and the website was put back online. On July 12, 2019, PapaHH explained that the "whole situation played out over a misunderstanding" and that Hentai Haven would "continue as an independent entity, with Fakku helping [them] achieve [their] goal of legitimacy."

On April 1, 2021, Fakku announced Fakku Audio, a "hands-free hentai experience" featuring the voices of several YouTube personalities, which was later revealed to be an April Fool's Day prank.

On August 31, 2021, the FAKKU online store that was hosted by a third party provider went down, and was unable to take digital and physical orders. Digital purchases were made available again on October 8, 2021.

Divisions

FAKKU Books 

Fakku also distributes a few books released by Denpa Books: Pleasure & Corruption, Volume 1, Pleasure & Corruption, Volume 2, and PEZ.

Kuma 
On July 1, 2019, Kuma was officially launched as an LGBTQ imprint of Fakku.

Announcements 
A list of upcoming titles and older titles selected for reprinting can be found on the following dedicated forum post.

FAKKU Games 

Eroge from other publishers (Denpasoft, Jast USA, MediBang...) are distributed as well.

Anime 
In 2011, Kitty Media entered a licensing partnership with Fakku to stream select titles, starting with Immoral Sisters. In 2017, Kitty Media was acquired by Fakku for digital distribution while physical distribution will still be maintained by Media Blasters.

Other

Doujinshi 
Fakku first released doujinshi at Anime Expo 2015 with an exclusive compilation, Bosshi's XXX MiX. Since then, they have regularly put out more self-published content (both Western and Japanese) and also started distributing works localised by other established publishers such as 2D Market.

Merchandising 
Fakku also sells merchandise through their own store, such as T-shirts, skateboards, plushies, figures, etc. Some items are imported from the Japanese market while others are done specifically in collaboration with renowned artists for their own customers.

Music 
In 2017, Fakku and independent label Zoom Lens teamed up to create a compilation in the form of a 36-page artbook along a vinyl or a CD. "The project focuses on the philosophical narrative of the soul searching for new experiences without judgment, conceptualized by illustrators creating an original piece narrating each song in the album." The cover illustration was drawn by Shintaro Kago.

See also
 E-Hentai

References

External links

 

American webcomics
Comic book publishing companies of the United States
Hentai companies
Internet properties established in 2006
2017 mergers and acquisitions